Terminal Peak is a  mountain summit located in Glacier National Park of British Columbia, Canada. As part of the Selkirk Mountains, it is situated at the south end of the compact Sir Donald Range, hence the name origin. The nearest higher peak is Mount Sir Donald,  to the immediate northwest, and Mount Macoun rises  to the south. The expansive Illecillewaet Névé lies to the southwest, the Sir Donald Glacier lies below the steep northeast wall, and a small unnamed glacier lies at the bottom of the steep southeast slope. Precipitation runoff from the mountain and meltwater from the glaciers drains west into the Illecillewaet River, and east into the Beaver River.

History
The first ascent of the peak was made in 1906 by Allan F. Kitchell, Cornelius P. Kitchell, and Edward Feuz Jr. The mountain's toponym was officially adopted December 31, 1924, by the Geographical Names Board of Canada.

Climate
Based on the Köppen climate classification, Terminal Peak is located in a subarctic climate zone with cold, snowy winters, and mild summers. Winter temperatures can drop below −20 °C with wind chill factors below −30 °C.

See also
 
Geography of British Columbia

References

External links
 Weather: Mountain Forecast

Two-thousanders of British Columbia
Selkirk Mountains
Glacier National Park (Canada)
Columbia Country
Kootenay Land District